Azurety is an album by trombonist/tubist Ray Anderson, drummer Han Bennink and guitarist Christy Doran which was released on the hat ART label in 1994.

Reception

The Allmusic review by Glenn Astarita stated "On this release, the trio is simply having a blast as they surge forward with the intensity of your average high-octane, heavy metal rock outfit. ... The trio engages in uninhibited dialogue in concert with ominous sounding undercurrents thanks to a rollicking and rolling presentation of pieces spanning bluesy, dirge-like progressions and turbulently executed exchanges. ... The musicians also provide the listener with softly enacted swing vamps along with some downright riotous interplay. Recommended!".

Track listing
All compositions by Ray Anderson except where noted
 "Open House" (Christy Doran) – 11:21
 "Azurety" – 7:04
 "B & D" (Han Bennink, Christy Doran) – 4:29
 "March of the Hipsters" – 6:54
 "Heights" (Doran) – 10:55
 "Just Squeeze Me" (Duke Ellington) – 3:29
 "A B D" (Anderson, Bennink, Doran) – 3:26
 'The Waters Dixon Line" – 7:55

Personnel
Ray Anderson – trombone, tuba
Han Bennink – drums
Christy Doran – acoustic guitar, electric guitar, delay devices

References

Ray Anderson (musician) albums
Han Bennink albums
1994 albums
Hathut Records albums